The Permanent Contingency Commission of Honduras (COPECO), is an entity created to coordinate public and private disaster relief efforts in the framework of the National Risk Management System of Honduras.

COPECO is part of a Central American network of governmental disaster relief agencies known as the Coordination Center for the Prevention of Natural Disasters in Central America (CEPREDENAC). CEPREDENAC was created in the context of the Central American Integration System (SICA).

References

External links 
 
 Official website of CEPREDENAC
 SATCA early warning system for Central America
 Humanitarian Information Network for Latin America and the Caribbean (Red de Información Humanitaria  para América Latina y el Caribe (Redhum))

Government of Honduras
Emergency management